"Try a Little Kindness" is a song written by Curt Sapaugh and Bobby Austin, first recorded by American country music singer Glen Campbell. The song was a hit on three different music charts: it peaked at number two for one week on the country charts.  "Try a Little Kindness" went to number one for one week on the Hot Adult Contemporary chart as well as peaking at number 23 on the Billboard Hot 100.

Chart performance

Other notable recordings
1969: The Wilburn Brothers – album: Little Johnny From Down the Street
1969: Wanda Jackson – album: Country
1970: Jack Greene – album: Lord is That Me
1970: Ginette Reno – album: Beautiful Second Hand Man
1970: Lynn Anderson – album: I'm Alright
1971: Kitty Wells – album: Pledging My Love
1971: The Oak Ridge Boys – album: "Talk About the Good Times"
1972: Frances Yip (葉麗儀) – album: Frances Yip Golden Hits
1996: The Whites – album: Give A Little Back
2006: Bobby Osborne & the Rocky Top X-Press – album: Try a Little Kindness

References

1969 singles
1969 songs
Capitol Records singles
Glen Campbell songs
Wanda Jackson songs
Jack Greene songs
The Oak Ridge Boys songs
Kitty Wells songs
Lynn Anderson songs
Song recordings produced by Al De Lory